The Mera is a river in Switzerland and Italy. Its source is near the Piz Mungiroi, in the Grisons, Switzerland. First, it flows east in the direction to Maloja Pass, then turns west through the Val Bregaglia and crosses the border to Italy in Castasegna (Dogana). It is joined by the Acquafraggia close to Piuro, and then turns south at Chiavenna, just before it receives the river Liro from the right at Prata Camportaccio. The Mera ends in Lake Como, near Sorico in the Province of Como.

References

External links

Rivers of Switzerland
Rivers of Italy
Rivers of Lombardy
Rivers of the Province of Sondrio
Rivers of the Province of Como
Val Bregaglia
International rivers of Europe
Rivers of Graubünden